The 32nd Annual Grammy Awards were held on February 21, 1990, and hosted by Garry Shandling. They recognized accomplishments by musicians from the previous year.

Performers
 Bette Midler - Wind Beneath My Wings
 Gloria Estefan - Don't Wanna Lose You
 Fine Young Cannibals - She Drives Me Crazy
 Michael Bolton & Kenny G - How Am I Supposed To Live Without You
 Don Henley - The End of the Innocence
 Rodney Crowell - After All This Time
 k.d. lang - Luck in My Eyes
 Billy Joel - We Didn't Start The Fire
 Bonnie Raitt - Thing Called Love
 Mike + The Mechanics - The Living Years
 Aaron Neville & Linda Ronstadt - Don't Know Much
 Milli Vanilli - Girl You Know It's True

Presenters
 Anita Baker, Sting & Stevie Wonder - Record of the Year
 Natalie Cole & Ella Fitzgerald - Album of the Year
 Michael Bolton & Kenny G - Song of the Year
 Kris Kristofferson - Best New Artist
 Exposé & Randy Travis - Best Pop Performance by a Duo or Group with Vocals
 Patrick Swayze & Paula Abdul - Best Male Pop Vocal Performance
 Olivia Newton-John & Sam Kinison - Best Female Pop Vocal Performance
 B.B. King & John Lee Hooker - Best Female R&B Vocal Performance
 The Nitty Gritty Dirt Band & Dwight Yoakam - Best Male & Female Country Vocal Performance
 New Kids on the Block - Best Rap Performance
 Taylor Dayne & Mötley Crüe - Best Female Rock Vocal Performance

Award winners
The Grammy Award for Best New Artist was originally awarded to Milli Vanilli. However, on November 20, 1990, the National Academy of Recording Arts and Sciences revoked the award after producer Frank Farian admitted the duo did not sing at all on their album, Girl You Know It's True. As of the 2021 ceremony, this is the only time where a Grammy has been revoked.

General
Record of the Year
Arif Mardin (producer) & Bette Midler (artist) for "Wind Beneath My Wings"
Don Henley, Bruce Hornsby (producers) & Don Henley (artist) for "The End of the Innocence"
Christopher Neil, Mike Rutherford (producers) & Mike + The Mechanics (artist) for "The Living Years" 
David Z. Fine, Fine Young Cannibals (producers) & Fine Young Cannibals (artist) for "She Drives Me Crazy"
Mick Jones, Billy Joel (producers) & Billy Joel (artist) for "We Didn't Start The Fire"

Album of the Year
Don Was (producer) & Bonnie Raitt for Nick of Time
Don Henley, Danny Kortchmar (producers) & Don Henley (artist) for The End of the Innocence 
Jeff Lynne, Tom Petty, Mike Campbell (producers) & Tom Petty (artist) for Full Moon Fever
Fine Young Cannibals (producers) & Fine Young Cannibals (artist) for The Raw and the Cooked
Jeff Lynne, George Harrison (producers) & Traveling Wilburys (artists) for Traveling Wilburys Vol. 1 
Song of the Year
Jeff Silbar & Larry Henley (songwriters) for "Wind Beneath My Wings" performed by Bette Midler

Blues
Best Traditional Blues Recording
Bonnie Raitt & John Lee Hooker for "I'm in the Mood"
Best Contemporary Blues Recording
Stevie Ray Vaughan & Double Trouble In Step

Children's
Best Recording for Children
J. Aaron Brown, David R. Lehman (producers) & Tanya Goodman for The Rock-A-Bye Collection, Vol. 1

Classical
Best Orchestral Performance
Leonard Bernstein (conductor) & the New York Philharmonic for Mahler: Symphony No. 3 in D Minor
Best Classical Vocal Soloist Performance
David Zinman (conductor), Dawn Upshaw & the Orchestra of St. Luke's for Knoxville - Summer of 1915 (Music of Barber, Menotti, Harbison, Stravinsky)
Best Opera Recording
Cord Garben (producer), James Levine (conductor), Hildegard Behrens, Gary Lakes, Christa Ludwig, Kurt Moll, James Morris, Jessye Norman & the Metropolitan Opera Orchestra for Wagner: Die Walküre
Best Choral Performance (other than opera)
Robert Shaw (conductor) & the Atlanta Symphony Orchestra & Chorus for Britten: War Requiem
 Best Classical Performance, Instrumental Soloist (with orchestra)
David Zinman (conductor), Yo-Yo Ma & the Baltimore Symphony Orchestra for Barber: Cello Concerto, Op. 22/Britten: Symphony for Cello and Orchestra, Op. 68
Best Classical Performance - Instrumental Soloist (without orchestra)
Andras Schiff for Bach: English Suites
Best Chamber Music Performance
The Emerson String Quartet for Bartók: 6 String Quartets
Best Contemporary Composition
Steve Reich (composer) & the Kronos Quartet for Reich: Different Trains 
Best Classical Album
Wolf Erichson (producer) & the Emerson String Quartet for Bartók: 6 String Quartets

Comedy
Best Comedy Recording
Peter Schickele for P.D.Q. Bach: 1712 Overture and Other Musical Assaults

Composing and arranging
Best Instrumental Composition
Danny Elfman (composer) for "The Batman Theme" performed by the Sinfonia of London Orchestra
Best Song Written Specifically for a Motion Picture or Television
Carly Simon (songwriter) for "Let the River Run"
Best Album of Original Instrumental Background Score Written for a Motion Picture or Television 
Dave Grusin (composer) for The Fabulous Baker Boys
Best Arrangement on an Instrumental
Dave Grusin (arranger) for "Suite From The Milagro Beanfield War" 
Best Instrumental Arrangement Accompanying Vocals
Dave Grusin (arranger) for "My Funny Valentine" performed by Michelle Pfeiffer

Country
Best Country Vocal Performance, Female
k.d. lang for Absolute Torch and Twang
Best Country Vocal Performance, Male
Lyle Lovett for Lyle Lovett and His Large Band
Best Country Performance by a Duo or Group with Vocal
Nitty Gritty Dirt Band for Will the Circle Be Unbroken: Volume Two
Best Country Vocal Collaboration
Hank Williams Jr. & Hank Williams Sr. for "There's a Tear in My Beer" 
Best Country Instrumental Performance
Randy Scruggs for "Amazing Grace"
Best Country Song
Rodney Crowell (songwriter) for "After All This Time"
Best Bluegrass Recording
Bruce Hornsby & Nitty Gritty Dirt Band for "The Valley Road"

Folk
Best Traditional Folk Recording
Marcel Cellier (producer) for Le Mystere des Voix Bulgares, Vol. II performed by the Bulgarian State Television Female Vocal Choir
Best Contemporary Folk Recording
Indigo Girls for Indigo Girls

Gospel
Best Gospel Vocal Performance, Female 
CeCe Winans for "Don't Cry"
Best Gospel Vocal Performance, Male 
BeBe Winans for "Meantime"
Best Gospel Vocal Performance by a Duo or Group, Choir or Chorus
Take 6 for "The Savior Is Waiting"
Grammy Award for Best Soul Gospel Performance, Male or Female
Al Green for "As Long as We're Together"
Best Soul Gospel Performance by a Duo or Group, Choir or Chorus
Daniel Winans for "Let Brotherly Love Continue"

Historical
Best Historical Album
Andy McKaie (producer) for Chuck Berry - The Chess Box

Jazz
Best Jazz Vocal Performance, Female
Ruth Brown for Blues on Broadway
Best Jazz Vocal Performance, Male
Harry Connick Jr. for When Harry Met Sally
Best Jazz Vocal Performance, Duo or Group
Dr. John & Rickie Lee Jones for "Makin' Whoopee"
Best Jazz Instrumental Performance, Soloist (On a Jazz Recording)
Miles Davis for Aura
Best Jazz Instrumental Performance, Group
Chick Corea Akoustic Band for Chick Corea Akoustic Band
Best Jazz Instrumental Performance, Big Band
Miles Davis for Aura
Best Jazz Fusion Performance
Pat Metheny Group for Letter from Home

Latin
Best Latin Pop Performance
Jose Feliciano for "Cielito Lindo"
Best Tropical Latin Performance
Ray Barretto & Celia Cruz for Ritmo en el Corazon
Best Mexican-American Performance
Los Lobos for La pistola y el corazón

Musical show
Best Musical Cast Show Album
Jay David Saks (producer) & the original cast with Jason Alexander & Debbie Shapiro & Robert La Fasse for Jerome Robbins' Broadway

Music video
Best Music Video, Short Form
Jim Blashfield, Paul Diener, Frank DiLeo, Jerry Kramer, (video producers), Jim Blashfield (video director) & Michael Jackson for "Leave Me Alone"
Best Music Video, Long Form
Aris McGarry (video producer), Jonathan Dayton and Valerie Faris (video producers & directors), Dominic Sena (video director), & Janet Jackson for Rhythm Nation 1814

New Age
Best New Age Performance
Peter Gabriel for Passion - Music For the Last Temptation of Christ

Packaging and notes
Best Album Package
Roger Gorman (art director) for Sound + Vision performed by David Bowie
Best Album Notes
Phil Schaap (notes writer) for Bird - The Complete Charlie Parker on Verve

Polka
Best Polka Recording
Jimmy Sturr for All in My Love for You

Pop
Best Pop Vocal Performance, Female
Bonnie Raitt for "Nick of Time"
Best Pop Vocal Performance, Male
Michael Bolton for "How Am I Supposed to Live Without You"
Best Pop Performance by a Duo or Group with Vocal
Aaron Neville & Linda Ronstadt for "Don't Know Much"
Best Pop Instrumental Performance
The Neville Brothers for "Healing Chant"

Production and engineering
Best Engineered Recording, Non-Classical
George Massenburg (engineer) for Cry Like a Rainstorm - Howl Like the Wind performed by Linda Ronstadt
Best Engineered Recording, Classical
Jack Renner (engineer), Robert Shaw (conductor), the Atlanta Symphony Orchestra & the Atlanta Boy Choir for Britten: War Requiem 
Producer of the Year
Peter Asher
Classical Producer of the Year
Robert Woods

R&B
Best R&B Vocal Performance, Female
Anita Baker for "Giving You the Best That I Got"
Best R&B Vocal Performance, Male
Bobby Brown for "Every Little Step"
Best R&B Performance by a Duo or Group with Vocal
Soul II Soul & Caron Wheeler for "Back to Life"
Best R&B Instrumental Performance
Soul II Soul for "African Dance"
Best Rhythm & Blues Song
Kenny Gamble & Leon Huff (songwriters) for "If You Don't Know Me By Now" performed by Simply Red

Rap
Best Rap Performance
Young MC for "Bust a Move"

Reggae
Best Reggae Recording
Ziggy Marley & the Melody Makers for One Bright Day

Rock
Best Rock Vocal Performance, Female 
Bonnie Raitt for Nick of Time
Best Rock Vocal Performance, Male 
Don Henley for The End of the Innocence
Best Rock Performance by a Duo or Group with Vocal
Traveling Wilburys for Traveling Wilburys Vol. 1 
Best Rock Instrumental Performance
Jeff Beck, Terry Bozzio & Tony Hymas for Jeff Beck's Guitar Shop with Terry Bozzio & Tony Hymas
Best Hard Rock Performance
Living Colour for "Cult of Personality"
Best Metal Performance
Metallica for "One"

Spoken
Best Spoken Word or Non-musical Recording
Gilda Radner for It's Always Something (awarded posthumously)

Special Merit Awards
Nat "King" Cole, Miles Davis, Vladimir Horowitz, and Paul McCartney were each awarded the Grammy Lifetime Achievement Award.

References

 032
1990 in California
1990 music awards
1990 in Los Angeles
1990 in American music
Grammy
February 1990 events in the United States